The GFZ German Research Centre for Geosciences, also known as GFZ Helmholtz Centre Potsdam or just GFZ, is the national research center for Earth Sciences in Germany, located on the Telegrafenberg in Potsdam, in the German federal state of Brandenburg, and is part of the  Helmholtz Association of National Research Centres.

"GFZ" stands for GeoForschungsZentrum (Geo-research Centre).

History 
The GFZ was founded in 1992. It is the latest in a long line of research institutes that have been located on the Telegrafenberg. These have included the Central Institute of for Physics of the Earth (ZIPE), which was an institute of the Academy of Sciences of the GDR (German Democratic Republic) that was actively involved in Geodesy. Under the directorship of Friedrich Robert Helmert from 1886 to 1917, the institute developed into the world's leading center for scientific geodesy. The current GFZ is supported 90% by the German Ministry of Education and Research, and 10% from the Ministry of Science, Research, and Culture from the state of Brandenburg.

Exhibition 
Between 24 March and 9 July 2017 GFZ shows a bilingual exhibition (German / English) with the title Focus: Earth - Measuring our World in the Haus der Brandenburgisch-Preußischen Geschichte in Potsdam with many exhibits of the history of geosciences on the Telegrafenberg hill.

See also 
Johann Heinrich Louis Krüger
Heinrich Bruns
Otto Eggert

References

External links 

 

Research institutes in Germany
Research institutes established in 1992
1992 establishments in Germany
Organisations based in Potsdam